Saumarez (28 March 1987–2012) was a Thoroughbred racehorse who won France's most prestigious race, the Prix de l'Arc de Triomphe in 1990.

Background
Saumarez was sired by the 1985 Prix de l'Arc de Triomphe winner Rainbow Quest in his first season at stud. He was owned by National Hockey League superstar Wayne Gretzky and owner of his Los Angeles Kings ice hockey team, Bruce McNall. He was trained at trained by Henry Cecil at his Warren Place stable at Newmarket, Suffolk.

Racing career
Saumarez failed to win at age two in 1989 then got his first win in 1990 under Steve Cauthen in the Aldborough Maiden Stakes. Following a win in the Harvester Graduation Stakes, he finished second to winner Blue Stag in the Dee Stakes at Chester Racecourse.

In June he was sent to France where Nicolas Clément took over as trainer. Steve Cauthen rode Saumarez to victory in the Grand Prix de Paris and then under French jockey Gérald Mossé, he won the Prix du Prince d'Orange in September and October's prestigious, Prix de l'Arc de Triomphe. For majority owner Bruce McNall, it was his second Arc win, having won it in 1987 with Trempolino. Nicolas Clément became the youngest trainer to win this race. Saumarez was then sent to the United States for the Breeders' Cup Turf at Belmont Park in Elmont, New York where he finished fifth to In the Wings whom he had beaten in the Arc.

Stud record
Sold for $8 million to a syndicate led by C A B St. George, Saumarez was retired to stud. He formerly stands at Odessa Stud in Ceres, Western Cape in South Africa and Died in 2012. He has sired twelve stakes winners and notably is the damsire of 2007 Epsom Derby winner, Authorized.

Pedigree

Saumarez was inbred 4 × 4 to Nasrullah, meaning that this stallion appeared twice in the fourth generation of his pedigree.

References

External links
 Video at YouTube of Saumarez winning the 1990 Prix de l'Arc De Triomphe (called by Tom Durkin)

1987 racehorse births
2012 racehorse deaths
Racehorses bred in the United Kingdom
Racehorses trained in France
Arc winners
Thoroughbred family 16-a